François C.H. Giguère (born June 24, 1963) was the former general manager and executive vice president of the Colorado Avalanche. He was promoted on May 24, 2006. He previously worked for the Dallas Stars as assistant general manager and, previous to that, he worked in the Avalanche organization as vice president of hockey operations for the 2001 season and as assistant general manager between 1995 and 2000. He also worked in the Quebec Nordiques organization between 1990 and 1995. He has won two Stanley Cups in his career with Colorado, 1996 and 2001. He was released from the Colorado Avalanche on Monday April 13, 2009.

External links 
 Avalanche to announce Giguere as GM

1963 births
Living people
Colorado Avalanche executives
Dallas Stars executives
National Hockey League executives
National Hockey League general managers
People from Sainte-Foy, Quebec City
Quebec Nordiques personnel
Ice hockey people from Quebec City
Stanley Cup champions